Ilat-e Yalquz Aghaj (also Romanized as Īlāt-e Yālqūz Āghāj) is a village in Koshksaray Rural District, in the Central District of Marand County, East Azerbaijan Province, Iran. At the 2006 census, its population was 1,501, in 352 families.

References 

Populated places in Marand County